King Edward VI Grammar School, or KEGS, is a British grammar school with academy status located in the city of Chelmsford, Essex, England. It takes pupils between the ages of 11 and 18, ie. school years 7 to 13. For years 7 to 11 the school is boys-only, whereas it is mixed in the sixth form (years 12 and 13).  The headteacher is Tom Carter, who was appointed in the autumn of 2014.

History of the school 
KEGS was one of many grammar schools founded by  Edward VI. Its current form resulted from a royal warrant dated 24 March 1551, although evidence of this school exists from as far back as the 13th century, possibly earlier, as a chantry school in a different location in Chelmsford.  Indeed, the school of 1551 was merely a "rebranding" of the Chelmsford Chantry School, a Roman Catholic institution which had been abolished along with the monasteries during the English Reformation.  The school was moved to its present site on Broomfield Road in 1892. Once a boarding school, it was one of many grammar schools to join the state sector and abolish the nominal fees. The last boarding students left in the 1970s. In 1976 it admitted the first female pupil to the Sixth Form, to study Classics.

The school has been ranked in the top 50 schools in the country in national examination league tables. KEGS was previously a Foundation School and Specialist Science College and Language College. The school converted to academy status in April 2011, but continues to have science and languages as specialisms. It is also a Leading Edge school.

In 1981 it was named by The Sunday Times as the most successful state school as measured by Oxbridge open awards. In 1998, it was rated by the Financial Times as the most successful state school at GCE advanced level in the period 1993-1998. In 2001 the school was named Sunday Times School of the Year. The 2015 Good Schools Guide names KEGS as the top selective state school for a number of A-level subjects, as well as GCSE History and FSMQ Additional Mathematics. In December 2021, it was judged to be "outstanding" by OFSTED.

House system 
In 1907, headmaster Frank Rogers set up the system of "Houses" – Holland, named for the translator Philemon Holland; Mildmay, for the courtier and politician Sir Walter Mildmay; Strutt, for the antiquary Joseph Strutt; and Tindal, for the lawyer Sir Nicholas Conyngham Tindal, and dividing the school into four forms in each year. Due to the expansion of the school roll over the last few years, this has not been the case. Instead, there are five forms, which contain a mix of people from different houses.

Extracurricular activities

Combined Cadet Force and Corps of Drums 
The school maintains an Army contingent of the Combined Cadet Force (CCF), which was also open to students of Chelmsford County High School for Girls until 2017. Military music is provided within the contingent by a Corps of Drums playing drums, flutes and bugles. The Corps wears the full dress scarlet tunics of The Essex Regiment, incorporating the purple facings which gave the Essex Regiment its nickname 'The Pompadours'. It carries the drums of the 5th Battalion (Territorial Army) emblazoned with the Regiment's battle honours.

KEGS Music 
The school has many ensembles, of which the orchestras include members from other schools, though the majority are from KEGS and Chelmsford County High School for Girls. The other ensembles are exclusive to those who attend KEGS.
 Junior Orchestra (Combined with KEGS Strings)
 Senior Orchestra
 Choir
 Wind Band
 Jazz Ensemble
 Big Band

The KEGS Ambassador 
The KEGS Ambassador is the school's independent student newspaper. Since its creation in January 2009, it has featured numerous articles by alumni, staff and students.

KEGS Young Engineers 
The KEGS Young Engineers team won the 2022 PAPI Raspberry Pi Competition in the years 12-13 division, as well as the People's Choice Award and has made it to the final every year since the competition started.

The team competes in the FIRST Lego League Challenge, sending two year 8 and 9 teams every year, having gone to the finals numerous times, as well as a year 12 team annually to the Student Robotics competition where they have reached the quarter-finals multiple times.

KEGS Languages Society 
The KEGS Languages Society (Langsoc) is a group where both concepts in linguistics and the structure of specific languages are discussed, mostly in short presentations.
 
Langsoc also provides training for the United Kingdom Linguistics Olympiad (UKLO). A notable success is of a student winning a gold medal in the International Linguistics Olympiad (IOL) in 2022.

KEGS Medical Society 
The KEGS Medical Society (MedSoc) is the society where topical medical issues are discussed.

The KEGS Economics Journal 
The KEGS Economics Journal is another of the school's student-led newspapers. They feature articles on a wide variety of national and international economic and political affairs.

Notable former pupils

Of the Chelmsford Chantry School (before the Royal Charter of 1551) 
 John Dee, mathematician, astronomer, astrologer, geographer, occultist, and consultant to Queen Elizabeth I; responsible for the English translation of Euclid's work.

Pre-1900 
 John Hilton (surgeon), professor of human anatomy and surgery at the Royal College of Surgeons, president of the Hunterian Society
 Philemon Holland, classical scholar
 Joseph Strutt, author of "Sports and Pastimes of the People of England"
 Nicholas Conyngham Tindal, Lord Chief Justice of The Court of Common Pleas

1900-1960 
 Claude Colleer Abbott, poet and academic
 H. H. Abbott, poet and headmaster
 John Baker, Downing Professor of the Laws of England at the University of Cambridge and leading legal historian
 J. A. Baker, author of The Peregrine and The Hill of Summer
 Norman Fowler, former Lord Speaker; Conservative politician; former Cabinet minister
 Peter Joslin, Chief Constable of Warwickshire Police (1983–1998)
 Ron Loveday, Labor minister in South Australia
 Tony Oliver (referee), English Football League referee
 Brian Parkyn, Labour MP for Bedford from 1966–70
 Peter Seabrook, gardener and broadcaster
 John G. Taylor, professor of Mathematics at King's College London from 1971–96, and President of the European Neural Network Society from 1993-4
 John Urquhart, cricketer
 Paul White, Baron Hanningfield, politician and member of the House of Lords
 Denis Wick, trombonist
 Clive Young, former Bishop of Dunwich

Post-1960
 Nick Alston, Essex's first Police and Crime Commissioner
 Nick Bourne, Conservative politician
 Neil Cole, comedian, television presenter and radio broadcaster
 Mervyn Day, former FA Cup winning professional footballer and former assistant manager of West Ham United Football Club
 Alex Dowsett, British cyclist
 Guthrie Govan, guitarist and guitar teacher, named "Guitarist of the Year" by Guitarist magazine in 1993
 Jason Hazeley, comedy writer 
 Simon Heffer, British journalist and writer for The Daily Telegraph and The Daily Mail
 Thomas Jenkinson, electronic and jazz musician, also known as Squarepusher
 Jon Lewis, former Essex and Durham cricketer
 Anthony Marwood, concert violinist
 James Maynard, Mathematician and Fields Medal winner
 Tim Mead, countertenor
 Anthony Milton, Commandant General Royal Marines and Commander UK Amphibious Forces from 2002-4
 Joel Morris, comedy writer
 Grayson Perry, 2003 Turner Prize winner
 Mike Smith, touring car driver and television presenter
 Joe Thomas, actor, writer and comedian
 John Tipler, international motoring journalist

Fictional
 John Watson, character in the 2010 BBC series of Sherlock. John Watson's CV is visible in episode two, where KEGS is cited under Education Qualifications (with 6 A*).

References

External links 
 The official KEGS website
 The School's most recent Ofsted inspection report

 
Educational institutions established in the 1550s
Grammar schools in Essex
1551 establishments in England
Academies in Essex
Schools with a royal charter
Schools in Chelmsford
King Edward VI Schools